Vamp is the fourth mini studio album by Japanese singer Akina Nakamori. It was released on 18 December 1996 under the MCA Records label and produced by Nakamori.

Background
Vamp is her only mini album which was released under MCA Records. It's also her first mini album to be released for the first time in eight years. The album consists of four new songs, which weren't released as a single neither in the original albums.

In 2008, all songs were recorded in the first press edition of compilation album of her works from the 1990s, Utahime Densetsu: 90's Best.

The concept of the album consist of cool and sexy vibrance through the dance music.

The music production team consist a music producers Hiroshi Yamada and Masanori Shimada, songwriters Gorō Matsui and Seriko Natsuno.

Stage performances
Nakamori performed all four songs only once, on her first dinner show in Xmas Dinner Show 1996.

Chart performance
The album debuted at number 30 on the Oricon Album Weekly Charts, remained in top 100 chart for 5 weeks and sold over 30,100 copies.

Track listing

References

1996 EPs
Akina Nakamori albums
Japanese-language EPs
Albums produced by Akina Nakamori